The Baltupis is a river of  Kėdainiai district municipality, Kaunas County, central Lithuania. It flows for 4.8 kilometres and has a basin area of 2.7 km². It is a tributary of the Nevėžis River. The Baltupis goes on the edge between Sirutiškis village and the northern limit of Kėdainiai (Babėnai).

The name Baltupis means 'white river' in Lithuainian.

Images

References
 LIETUVOS RESPUBLIKOS UPIŲ IR TVENKINIŲ KLASIFIKATORIUS (Republic of Lithuania- River and Pond Classifications).  Ministry of Environment (Lithuania). Accessed 2011-11-17.

Rivers of Lithuania
Kėdainiai District Municipality